Chapar Pord (also known as Chapar Pord-e Pā’īn and Chapar Pūr) is a village in Hajji Bekandeh-ye Koshk-e Bijar Rural District, Khoshk-e Bijar District, Rasht County, Gilan Province, Iran. At the 2006 census, its population was 925, in 265 families.

References 

Populated places in Rasht County